Labeobarbus iphthimostoma is a species of ray-finned fish in the genus Labeobarbus which is known only from the Lufira River in the Democratic Republic of the Congo.

References 

 

iphthimostoma
Taxa named by Keith Edward Banister
Taxa named by Max Poll
Cyprinid fish of Africa
Fish described in 1973
Endemic fauna of the Democratic Republic of the Congo